Al-Hawj al-Adani is a sub-district located in Al Mashannah District, Ibb Governorate, Yemen. Al-Hawj al-Adani had a population of  6116 as of 2004.

References 

Sub-districts in Al Mashannah District